Nicole Nicoleitzik (born 1 August 1995) is a German Paralympic athlete who competes in sprint and long jump events. She is the younger sister of Claudia Nicoleitzik.

References

External links
 
 

1995 births
Living people
German female sprinters
German female long jumpers
Paralympic athletes of Germany
Athletes (track and field) at the 2016 Summer Paralympics
Athletes (track and field) at the 2020 Summer Paralympics
Medalists at the World Para Athletics European Championships
Sportspeople from Saarland
People from Saarlouis